Alalapadu Airstrip  is an airstrip serving Alalapadu in Suriname.

Airlines and destinations 
Airlines flying charters to this airport are:

See also

 List of airports in Suriname
 Transport in Suriname

References

External links
Alalapadu Airport
OurAirports - Alalapadu
OpenStreetMap - Alalapadu Airstrip

Airports in Suriname
Sipaliwini District